Atlântida Cinematográfica was a Brazilian film studio, founded 18 September 1941 in Rio de Janeiro by Moacir Fenelon and José Carlos Burle. It produced a total of 66 films before 1962, when it ceased operations, having become the most successful film production company in Brazil.

The studio's first production was Moleque Tião, but its success came from the genre known as chanchada, low-budget films with great popular appeal, such as Nem Sansão nem Dalila, Carlos Manga's Matar ou Correr, and Watson Macedo's Aviso aos navegantes featuring Anselmo Duarte. This genre dominated the market until the mid-1950s, promoting such artists as Grande Otelo, Oscarito, Zé Trindade, Cyl Farney, Eliana Macedo, Julie Bardot, and Fada Santoro.

References 

Film production companies of Brazil
1941 establishments in Brazil